

Plants

Gymnosperms

Angiosperms

Arthropods

Insects

Conodonts

New taxa

Archosauromorphs

Dinosaurs

New taxa
Data courtesy of George Olshevsky's dinosaur genera list.

Birds

New taxa

Plesiosaurs

New taxa

Pterosaurs 
In October, a partial Mesadacylus wing was discovered in the Kingsview Quarry of Colorado. This find marks the first time that a Morrison pterosaur has been found at more than one site in the formation.

New taxa

Lepidosauromorphs

Squamates

New taxa

Synapsids

Non-mammalian

References

 
2000s in paleontology
Paleontology